James "Jim" Green (born 3 December 1944 in Coventry) is a British writer and broadcaster who turned to writing as a full-time profession after a 25-year career in teaching. He has had over 40 titles published in various genres, from educational text books to travel guides to crime novels. His first foray into crime novels was called Bad Catholics (2010 Luath), the first part of a trilogy chronicling the exploits of reformed gangster Jimmy Costello. James has since moved to Accent Press to write a five book series on the development of the US intelligence service

Early life
Green was raised and attended school in Coventry, Warwickshire.  He was the second of three children, his brothers being Michael (b. 1938) and Francis 'Frank', (1948–2001). All three brothers eventually became primary school headteachers.
Jim Green was educated by the Vincentian Fathers at Bishop Ullathorne Grammar School, Coventry. He left school at sixteen and, after working as coal-miner, farm-worker, motor-cycle courier and building labourer, he went to St. Mary's College, Twickenham and qualified as a teacher.

Career

Teaching
During his teaching career Jim acquired, by part-time study, an Open University B.A. and a research M.A. in Education. He studied, again part-time and for three years, for a PhD in Education at Leicester University but, in 1983, the school where he was head teacher was completely destroyed by an arson attack and the final write-up of the research for the Doctorate was postponed, as it turned out, indefinitely. In 1997 Jim left teaching to become a full-time writer and published magazine articles and books on travel. He then began writing the first of what was to become the Jimmy Costello series Over the next thirty years he held positions of varying seniority in Warwickshire, Gibraltar, South Yorkshire, Leicestershire and Shropshire.

Turn to writing
By the 1970s Green was a rising primary headteacher and began writing educational books as a personal sideline. A Thesaurus for primary schools A Wordhunter's Companion was his first best-seller and remains in print in several countries to date having been translated into a number of languages. Although predominantly known as an educational writer of early years personal and social development he also wrote books in the fields of history, travel, humour and poetry followed achieving varying levels of success. Whilst Green varied his genres of writing, educational titles remained his most frequently published genre until his retirement from teaching due to ill health.

Full time writing
After retiring from teaching in the 1990s Green has been a full-time writer and publisher. He wrote and had published a wide variety of publications such as a history of Wales, an anthology of poetry with cartoonist, All The World's a Pub (with Bill Tidy illustrations) which for a short time was the best selling poetry book of the 21st century and A Christian guide to London, as well as re-publishing his educational material and becoming a contributor to The Tablet magazine and the Catholic Herald. He recently penned a trilogy of crime thrillers featuring the reformed gangster Jimmy Costello, Bad Catholics, Stealing God and Yesterdays Sins.
Bad Catholics was nominated for The CWA John Creasy (New Blood) Dagger at the 2009 Crime Thriller Awards.
James has since moved to Accent Press and in September 2012 he published the first of a five book series, Another Small Kingdom, a detailed and accurate historical novel that traces the origins of the US secret service in 1801. He continues to develop personal projects aside from his books.
In May 2013, James Green was Accent Press Author of the Month.

Personal life
Green is married to wife of 52 years, Patricia Green (née Brennan,) and they have had three children; Dominic, James and Joe.

Green currently lives in Newark, Nottinghamshire. Green and his family have previously lived in Berwick-upon-Tweed, Telford, Ashby-de-la-Zouch, Sheffield, Leicester and Coventry.

Green is a keen golfer, a fan of snooker and the Tour de France. He travels throughout Europe regularly to research his books. He is a devotee of the author P G Wodehouse and the American crime writer Robert B Parker, to whom he once lost a car in a game of poker.

Bibliography
(incomplete)
(1976) A Wordhunter's Companion (Prentice Hall)
(2008) Bad Catholics (Luath Press)
(2010) Yesterday's Sins (Luath Press)

References

External links
Personal Profile  at Amazon.co.uk

1944 births
Living people
Schoolteachers from the West Midlands
English writers
People from Coventry
English male writers